The Second Legislative Assembly of Telangana was constituted after the 2018 Telangana Legislative Assembly elections which were concluded earlier on 7 December 2018 and the results were announced on 11 December 2018.

Notable Members

Members 

Source

See also 

 2018 Telangana Legislative Assembly Elections
 Telangana Legislative Assembly
 Telangana Rashtra Samiti

References 

 
2014 establishments in India
Telangana MLAs 2018–2023